Elizabeth Brater (born April 12, 1951) is a Democratic former member of the Michigan Senate, who represented the 18th district from 2003 to 2010, and served as the Assistant Minority Leader. Her district included the cities of Ann Arbor and Ypsilanti. She was previously a member of the Michigan House of Representatives from 1995 to 2000.

Early life
Brater was born in Boston, Massachusetts. After graduating high school in 1969, she enrolled at the University of Chicago, where she remained for two years, but transferred to the University of Pennsylvania, completing her B.A. in English in 1973. She continued to receive an M.A. in History, magna cum laude, in 1976, and was a member of Phi Beta Kappa. She moved to Ann Arbor, Michigan in 1975, when her husband, Enoch Brater, took a job as an English professor at the University of Michigan. In Ann Arbor, she worked as an editor and writer, also teaching courses on local government and writing at the university.

Political career
Brater won election as a Democrat to the Ann Arbor city council from the city's Third Ward in 1988. She then ran for mayor of Ann Arbor in April 1991, defeating two-term incumbent Republican mayor Gerald D. Jernigan. Brater was the first woman to be elected mayor of Ann Arbor. As mayor, Brater established the city's extensive recycling program. 
After serving one two-year term, she was defeated in her mayoral reelection campaign, losing in April 1993 to the Republican challenger, former city council member Ingrid Sheldon, who went on to serve four two-year terms as mayor.

After her mayoral defeat, Brater ran successfully for the Michigan House of Representatives in November 1994. She served in the House from 1995 to 2000, representing Michigan's 53rd district. Term limits prevented Brater from running for a fourth term.

Brater was honored by the Michigan Sierra Club as its 1996 Environmentalist of the Year and by the Alliance for the Mentally Ill of Michigan as its 1998 Legislator of the Year.

In November 2002, Brater won election to the Michigan Senate. In the Democratic primary, she defeated a fellow member of the Michigan House, John Hansen of Dexter. In the general election, she triumphed easily over Republican candidate Gordon Darr, a Scio Township Trustee, and Green Party candidate Elliott Smith. In 2006, she was re-elected with more than 71% of the vote, but in 2010 was term-limited and thus barred from seeking re-election.

Committees
In the Michigan Senate, Brater was a member of the Judiciary and Finance committees, the vice-chair of the Natural Resources and Environmental Affairs and the Agriculture, Forestry and Tourism committees. Brater also served as a member of the Governor's Land Use Leadership Council.

Electoral history
2006 Election for the Michigan State Senate - 18th District

2002 Election for the Michigan State Senate - 18th District

References

External links
Michigan Senate - Liz Brater official government website
Floor Statements video clips
Project Vote Smart - Senator Elizabeth S. 'Liz' Brater (MI) profile
Follow the Money - Liz Brater
2006 2004 2002 2000 Senate campaign contributions
2000 1998 1996 House campaign contributions
Michigan Senate Democratic Caucus
Michigan Liberal - SD18
Mayors of Ann Arbor page at PoliticalGraveyard.com

Living people
1951 births
Mayors of Ann Arbor, Michigan
Democratic Party members of the Michigan House of Representatives
Democratic Party Michigan state senators
Women mayors of places in Michigan
Women state legislators in Michigan
University of Michigan faculty
20th-century American politicians
20th-century American women politicians
21st-century American politicians
21st-century American women politicians
University of Chicago alumni
Women city councillors in Michigan
Michigan city council members
American women academics
Politicians from Boston